In Norse mythology, Lævateinn is a weapon crafted by Loki mentioned in the Poetic Edda poem Fjölsvinnsmál. The name Lævateinn does not appear in the original manuscript reading, but is an emendation from Hævateinn made by Sophus Bugge and others. 

The weapon is needed to slay the rooster Viðofnir atop the Mímameiðr tree in order for the seeker to achieve his quest, or so replies the wise porter Fjölsviðr, the title character of the poem.

Lævateinn has variously been asserted to be a dart (or some projectile weapon), or a sword, or a wand, by different commentators and translators. It is glossed as literally meaning a "wand" causing damage by several sources, yet some of these same sources claim simultaneously that the name is a kenning for sword. Others prefer to regard it as a magic wand (seiðr staff).

Attestation 
Lævateinn is the only weapon capable of defeating the cockerel Viðofnir, as explained by Fiölsvith "the very wise" porter in the poem Fjölsvinnsmál. Lopt, the sword's maker, refers to Loki.

Name and meanings 

Hævateinn, the untampered form of the weapon's name as occurs in manuscript, has been glossed as "sure-striking dart/arrow" by Árni Magnússon in 1787, and rendered "an arrow's name /That never disappoints the aim" by A. S. Cottle in 1797.

Lævateinn, the emendation made by changing the first letter from H to L, was proposed by Sophus Bugge in 1860/1861, later printed in Bugge's edition of the Poetic Edda (1867 ), and construed to mean 'Wounding Wand', or 'damage twig',  or "Wand-of-Destruction".

To be fair, Lævateinn or læ-wand can have three possible senses of meaning, and the latter three English glosses exploit only one of them. The three meanings of læ (the nominative case of læva) are: "cunning", "deception", and "injury". The weapon's name is glossed as "wand of non deceit" in passing without further explanation by Einar Ólafur Sveinsson.

Fjölsvinnsmál 
The weapon is mentioned briefly thus in the poem Fjölsvinnsmál:

Bugge proposed that this poem Fjölsvinnsmál should be treated as Part II of Svipdagsmál (sequel to Part I Grógaldr), and the sword's name was emended to Lævateinn by him.

The poem underwent further modifications. The phrase "" ('placed in an iron vase') was modified by Hjalmar Falk to "", where Lægjarn denoted 'Lover of Ill', a nickname of Loki.

Theories 
The Laeva- stem of the weapon's name is considered the genitive form of Lae-, as occurs in Loki's nickname Lægjarn, where lae means 'deceit, fraud; bane', and so forth.

Type of weapon 
The identification of the type of weapon is not in agreement among commentators and translators.

The Hævateinn was interpreted to be a dart/arrow by Árni Magnússon and A. S. Cottle in the 18th century as already noted.

Whereas Finnur Jónsson glossed it as a sword, along with other editors at the beginning of early 20th century, and it was specifically claimed to be the same as the flaming sword of the giant Surtr by Henrik Schück.

Or, the Hævateinn or Lævateinn was probably a magic wand crafted by Loki according to others, e.g., Albert Morey Sturtevant, and a paper on seiðr magic staffs citing Rudolf Simek.

To complicate matters, the argument is also made by e.g. Lee M. Hollander that although Lævateinn is literally renderable as a "Wand-of-Destruction", it is etymologically considered to be a kenning for a sword.

In Adolfo Zavaroni and Reggio Emilia's conception of the poem, Lævateinn is a cudgel ("Evilcudgel"), while it is Viðofnir who owns a collection of rods (divining rods) whereamong he maintains his sickle. In fact, the word völr in the text literally means "rounded rods", although translators have figuratively interpreted the word to be the rooster's plumage.

Explanatory notes

References 
Citations

Bibliography

(texts and translations)
 
 
 
 
 
 
 
 

(secondary sources)

 
 
 
  
 
  

Mythological Norse weapons
Mythological swords
Loki
Wands